Hudson station may refer to:

 Hudson station (New York), a train station in Hudson, New York, United States
 Hudson station (Exo), a commuter rail station Hudson, Quebec, Canada

See also 
 Hudson Bay station, a railway station in Hudson Bay, Saskatchewan, Canada
 Hudson Generating Station, a power plant in Jersey City, New Jersey, United States
 Hudson Lake station, a train stop in Hudson Lake, Indiana, United States
 Hudson (disambiguation)